DVX may refer to:

 Dux, Latin for leader
Former IATA code for Denver International Airport
 DESQview/X, a text-mode multitasking program developed by Quarterdeck Office Systems
 Santana DVX, a sparkling wine endorsed by Carlos Santana
 "Santana DVX", a song about the wine from The Lonely Island's album Incredibad
 DVX, a sunglass brand that is sold at the Walmart Vision Center